In constraint satisfaction, backmarking is a variant of the backtracking algorithm.

Backmarking works like backtracking by iteratively evaluating variables in a given order, for example, . It improves over backtracking by maintaining information about the last time a variable  was instantiated to a value and information about what changed since then. In particular:

 for each variable , the algorithm stores some information relative to what changed since the last time it has evaluated ; in particular, it stores the minimal index  of a variable that was changed since then.

The second information is changed every time another variable is evaluated. In particular, the index of the "maximal unchanged variable since the last evaluation of " is possibly changed every time another variable  changes value.

The data collected this way is used to avoid some consistency checks. Two conditions allow to determine partial consistency or inconsistency without checking with the constraints.

 if , the evaluation  is still consistent as it was before; this allows for skipping some consistency checks, but the assignment  may still be inconsistent.

Contrary to other variants to backtracking, backmarking does not reduce the search space but only possibly reduce the number of constraints that are satisfied by a partial solution.

References

Constraint programming